William Loring Andrews (1837-1920) was an American rare book collector, publisher, and librarian. He was a trustee and the first librarian of New York's Metropolitan Museum of Art and its advocate for forty years. From 1888 to 1892, he served as the founder and president of the Grolier Club. He was also the founder and only president of the Society of Iconophiles. He was "an enthusiastic and discriminating collector of rare books, prints, paintings, and porcelains." 

He published 36 books, about 24 of which he wrote; many detailed "bookish themes" and/or New York City history. Andrews "selected the paper, typography, and bindings" for all of his books, while E. D. French and Sidney L. Smith provided tailpieces and other graphic elements.

According to the Met, "Andrews was a fundamental force in the early days of The Met, and he was the pivotal figure in the development and collection growth at The Met's great library."

Early life 
William Loring Andrews was born on September 9, 1837, in Manhattan, New York. He was born to Caroline C. Delamater Andrews and Loring Andrews. A posthumous obituary claimed he "was a descendant of that 'first settler' William Andrews, one of the Davenport Company which 'sailed from Boston in 1638 and settled the town of Quinnipiac, which they afterwards called New Haven.'"

On October 17, 1860, Andrews married Jane E. Crane (her father was Theodore Crane). They had two sons: Loring William Andrews and Theodore Crane Andrews. Both sons died in their youth. Loring W. Andrews died in 1882 while a senior at Yale, due to "a gun-shot wound received while on a duck shooting excursion." Theodore died in 1878, and was described as "bright in mind and engaging in manners...His taste and execution in Music were unusual. He studied Harmony when twelve years of age, and his mathematical ability at a very early age was marked." Both sons were avid collectors like their father.

Retirement and Metropolitan Museum of Art 

In 1878, Andrews retired from his father's leather and hide business. He began to have leisure time due to his retirement, which enabled him to become involved with the Metropolitan.

In March 1880, the Met's first building in Central Park opened, designed by Calbert Vaux and Jacob Wrey Mould. On August 28 of 1880, Andrews wrote to Metropolitan director Luigi Palma di Cesnola, "I shall be back in town by the middle of September with plenty of leisure time to do what I can to be at the Museum and especially to try to work up the library—would like to find someone to start it with 10,000 dollars." When the Museum moved from 14th street to its building in the park, Andrews "actually carried many of the things in baskets, himself, to prevent harm coming to them," impressing Met President Cesnola with his devotion. That year, the Metropolitan officially appointed Andrews as its first librarian. 

He lived on 38th street and commuted to the Metropolitan by bicycle.

In 1885, Andrews asked prolific engraver Edwin Davis French to create The Met library's first bookplate. Sidney Lawton Smith designed Andrew's personal bookplate in an unknown year.

In 1895, Andrews was appointed Honorary Librarian to allow the Met to hire its first salaried full-time librarian, William Clifford.

Circa 1901, Andrews sent a copy of his book Paul Revere and His Engraving to New Jersey financier Augustus Lefebvre Revere. A. L. Revere was Paul Revere's great-grandson and last remaining relative. Andrews thanked Revere for his kind letter and described how he enjoyed compiling his great-grandfather's artwork.

Bibliography

Death and legacy 

He died on March 19, 1920, in New York and was buried at the Green-Wood Cemetery in Brooklyn.

On April 22, 1920, a memorial meeting was held in honor of Andrews's legacy. It was attended by and featured speakers from the Grolier Club, the Society of Iconophiles, and the Metropolitan Museum of Art. It was described in the 1921 In Memoriam: William Loring Andrews, a privately printed book of which 50 copies were distributed.

References

1837 births
1920 deaths
American art collectors
American librarians
People associated with the Metropolitan Museum of Art
Burials at Green-Wood Cemetery